Hot Springs is a town in Madison County, North Carolina, United States. The population was 560 at the 2010 census. It is part of the Asheville Metropolitan Statistical Area. It is a resort town, reliant on the tourist economy of its namesake springs, and being situated near the Appalachian Trail and the French Broad River.

Geography
Hot Springs is located at  (35.895577, -82.831023).

Climate

Demographics

2020 census

As of the 2020 United States census, there were 520 people, 223 households, and 143 families residing in the town.

2000 census
As of the census of 2000, there were 645 people, 293 households, and 176 families residing in the town. The population density was 205.1 people per square mile (79.1/km2). There were 368 housing units at an average density of 117.0 per square mile (45.1/km2). The racial makeup of the town was 98.45% White, 0.47% African American, 0.47% Native American, 0.47% Asian, and 0.16% from two or more races. Hispanic or Latino of any race were 0.31% of the population.

There were 293 households, out of which 28.0% had children under the age of 18 living with them, 43.7% were married couples living together, 12.6% had a female householder with no husband present, and 39.9% were non-families. 37.5% of all households were made up of individuals, and 17.1% had someone living alone who was 65 years of age or older. The average household size was 2.13 and the average family size was 2.77.

In the town, the population was spread out, with 21.4% under the age of 18, 8.5% from 18 to 24, 25.6% from 25 to 44, 26.5% from 45 to 64, and 18.0% who were 65 years of age or older. The median age was 42 years. For every 100 females, there were 93.7 males. For every 100 females age 18 and over, there were 89.9 males.

The median income for a household in the town was $20,714, and the median income for a family was $30,882. Males had a median income of $30,714 versus $20,781 for females. The per capita income for the town was $12,497. 24.4% of the population and 16.1% of families were below the poverty line. 25.8% of those under the age of 18 and 29.7% of those 65 and older were living below the poverty level.

History
Hot Springs is located at the confluence of the French Broad River and Spring Creek. A natural thermal spring is located here, the only hot spring known in North Carolina and in much of the southeastern United States. Thus, this area has long been a destination for those looking for therapeutic relief from their ailments. Native Americans were the first to discover and use the 108° Fahrenheit (42° Celsius) mineral waters, and European immigrants settled the area over 200 years ago. It is reported that people were visiting the springs by 1778 for the waters' reported healing properties.

It was believed Jasper Dagy was the first owner of Warm Springs, as it was then called, and he sold it to William Neilson in 1791. Neilson built an inn, and Philip Hoodenpile built an estate and a ferry across the French Broad, as well as the toll road Jewel Hill Road.

In 1828, a major road was constructed through the current town, the Buncombe Turnpike, making the area more accessible.

By 1831, James Patton of Asheville bought the springs and had erected 350 room Warm Springs Hotel with its 13 tall columns representing the 13 original colonies in 1837. The dining room of this large hotel could seat 600 people. The railroad reached the village – then called Warm Springs – in 1882. The hotel burned in 1884 after 46 years of operation. Another hotel, called the Mountain Park, was built in 1886. A higher temperature spring was found, prompting the changing of the town's name from Warm Springs to Hot Springs in 1886. Sixteen marble pools were surrounded by landscaped lawns with croquet and tennis courts, and it was known as one of the most lavish resorts in the Southeast. By May 1917, the hotel and grounds were leased to the US Government to be used as an internment camp. Many German and Austro-Hungarian internees, noncombatant aliens, made local friends and stayed in the region after World War I. That hotel burned in 1920, and two more were built – neither as large and opulent and both later burned as well.

Economy
Today, the hot mineral springs are privately owned by a spa and private lodging rental businesses. Water is piped to outdoor tubs beside the river and Spring Creek. The town itself is becoming ever more popular as a modern tourist destination, for aside from the springs, outdoor recreation is abundant in the area. The Appalachian Trail runs along downtown's Bridge Street and climbs the mountains on either side of the river. Rafting and kayaking is popular on the French Broad River itself. There are numerous other hiking, mountain biking, backpacking, and sightseeing opportunities in the nearby Pisgah National Forest.

Hot Springs Historic District
 
Hot Springs Historic District was listed on the National Register of Historic Places in February 2009.  Also listed on the National Register of Historic Places are Dorland Memorial Presbyterian Church, the Henry Ottinger House, and Sunnybank.

Photo gallery

References

External links 
Official site

Towns in Madison County, North Carolina
Spa towns in the United States
Towns in North Carolina
Hot springs of North Carolina
Internment of German Americans
Populated places established in 1800
Asheville metropolitan area
North Carolina populated places on the French Broad River
World War I prisoner-of-war camps